Nerine krigei, commonly known as the corkscrew nerine or curly leaved nerine, is a bulb native to Gauteng and Mpumalanga provinces in South Africa.

Gallery

References

Amaryllidoideae